Siletiteniz (Sıletıteñız), also Seletyteniz, Seletytengiz  is an endorheic salt lake located in the Ishim Plain, part of the West Siberian Plain.
The lake lies partly in North Kazakhstan and in the Pavlodar Region, near the Russian border. 

Teniz is Kazakh for "sea", while the etymology of Selety is less clear. One hypothesis is that it derives from Yeniseian *sēre, "stag."

Geography
The lake basin covers  but the actual area covered by water varies according to the seasons. The northern and eastern shores are high and straight while the western shore is low-lying and indented, gradually giving way to salt marshes. Hydrogen sulfide is emitted from deposits at the bottom of the lake.

The lake is mainly fed by snow.

See also
List of lakes of Kazakhstan

References

Lakes of Kazakhstan
Endorheic lakes of Asia
Saline lakes of Asia